Edward George Wynyard  (1 April 1861 – 30 October 1936) was a British Army officer and an English cricketer who played in three Tests from 1896 to 1906. He captained Hampshire County Cricket Club between 1896 and 1899.

Wynyard was also a successful amateur football player. In 1881, he was a member of the Old Carthusians team that won the FA Cup Final, in which he scored the opening goal in a 3–0 victory over Old Etonians.

Early life
Wynyard was born 1 April 1861, at Saharanpur in British India, the son of a magistrate in the Bengal Civil Service. He was educated in England at Woodcote House School, Windlesham, at Charterhouse School from 1874 to 1877, and St Edward's School, Oxford, leaving in 1879.

Military career
Wynyard was commissioned a lieutenant in the 1st Regiment, Warwick Militia in 1881, transferring to regular service with the King's Liverpool Regiment in May 1883. With the latter he was stationed in India and saw active service in the Burma Expedition 1885–87, winning the Distinguished Service Order (DSO) in the latter year and being twice mentioned in despatches. Promoted captain on 19 March 1890, he transferred again the same year, to the Welch Regiment. He was Adjutant of the Oxford University Volunteers until late 1899, then instructor at the Royal Military College, Sandhurst from 26 December 1899 until August 1902, when he returned to his regiment. He retired in 1903.

While in charge of cricket at the college, he arranged an officer cadets' match against W.G. Grace's XI. Two days before the game Grace wrote to say he would be unable to play, but after learning none of the cadets had seen him play, Wynyard cleverly disguised himself with make-up and false beard and played in the match with the visiting team, batting, making several runs and getting purposely hit on the hand to retire 'hurt'. He revealed his identity minus beard and cap at the teams' lunch but no one had seen through the disguise and his realistic imitation of Grace's batting style.

After the outbreak of World War I, Wynyard was recalled in September 1914 as Major with the King's Liverpool Regiment, then was attached to the Army Ordnance Corps in May 1915 before transferring to the Middlesex Regiment in November 1916 when he became Commandant at Thornhill Labour Camp, Aldershot. He finally retired in April 1919 when he was awarded Officer of the Order of the British Empire (military division).

Sports

Cricket

Wynyard played cricket for his schools, notably for the XI at St Edwards's School, Oxford. He would become President of Charterhouse School's Cricket and Football Club from 1913 to 1919.

He played while stationed in India, in one match scoring 123 and 106 runs, both not out, in different innings and while on home leave in 1887 he scored 233 for the Incogniti against Phoenix Park in Dublin.

Wynyard played in three Test matches for England, one against Australia in 1896 and two against South Africa in 1905–06. He had to decline a place on the Test tour to Australia because of army duties in 1897–98. He was invited to captain England on the Test tour to Australia in 1907–08 but declined for family reasons.

He captained M.C.C. in their tour in New Zealand 1906–07 (no Test matches) and made further tours in West Indies 1904–05, topping batting with 562 runs at 40.14; M.C.C. in North America 1907; Egypt 1909; South Africa 1909–10; United States 1920; and Canada in 1923 when, aged sixty-two, he headed the bowling averages with his underarm lobs.

He played for Hampshire between 1878 and 1908 (including years they were not first-class in 1886–94) and captained the county in 1896–99. His final first-class match was for M.C.C. against Oxford University in 1912 and in all he scored 8,313 first-class runs, average 33.00, with 13 centuries including 268 runs for Hampshire against Yorkshire in 1896. In 1896 he was the second-highest scoring first-class player in national batting averages with 1,038 runs, average 49.42. In 1899 he was fifteenth placed with a greater 1,281 runs at 41.32.

Besides the M.C.C., on whose committee he served in 1920–24, he was member of the Free Foresters, and represented the South African Cricket Association in England in 1908.

Football
Wynyard was in the school association football XI at Charterhouse in 1876, and at St Edward's School, Oxford, also took up rugby union football, playing in that school's XV. In the latter game he was described as "a glorious three-quarter, fast and strong, and could turn on a sixpence when in full cry. Had he not gone into the army, he would have reached the top in the rugger world."

He was more active playing for the old boys' club Old Carthusians, as centre-forward. C.W. Alcock described him as "a heavy forward, charging and dribbling well; always middles splendidly" and "good forward, plenty of dash; makes himself obnoxious to the opposing backs".

He centred the Old Carthusians' team at the FA Cup Final at Kennington Oval on 9 April 1881, and, 25 minutes into the match, he scored his team's first goal in a 3–0 win against the Old Etonians. Earlier in the first half he attempted to score with a header.

He twice played for the Corinthians in 1893, scoring five goals. He also appeared in representative matches for London.

Other sports
Wynyard won the European international toboggan championship at Davos, Switzerland in 1894. It was while in the area he rescued a peasant from drowning in a lake on 9 December 1893, earning the award in 1895 of the medal of the Royal Humane Society.

He played county hockey for Hampshire and later took up golf, forming his own club, "The Jokers" which was drawn largely from distinguished cricketers of which he was "Chief Joker". Other clubs he joined were Beaconsfield, Royal Wimbledon and Oxford Graduates' Golfing Society.

Later life
Wynyard died at his home, The Red House, at Knotty Green near Beaconsfield on 30 October 1936, aged 75, and was buried in the churchyard at Penn, Buckinghamshire.

Honours
Old Carthusians
FA Cup winner: 1881

References

External links

1861 births
1936 deaths
Academics of the Royal Military College, Sandhurst
Burials in Buckinghamshire
Military personnel of British India
People educated at Charterhouse School
People educated at St Edward's School, Oxford
England Test cricketers
English cricketers
Free Foresters cricketers
Hampshire cricket captains
Hampshire cricketers
I Zingari cricketers
Companions of the Distinguished Service Order
Gentlemen of the South cricketers
Gentlemen cricketers
North v South cricketers
King's Regiment (Liverpool) officers
Welch Regiment officers
Middlesex Regiment officers
Marylebone Cricket Club cricketers
Gentlemen of England cricketers
S. H. Cochrane's XI cricketers
C. I. Thornton's XI cricketers
Second Class Counties cricketers
A. J. Webbe's XI cricketers
FA Cup Final players
British Army personnel of World War I
Royal Army Ordnance Corps officers
Association footballers not categorized by position
Association football players not categorized by nationality
People educated at Woodcote House School